Marie Scheublé (born in 1974) is a French classical violinist.

Biography 
Scheublé began her violin studies at the age of 5, then became a student of Gérard Poulet at the age of 9. She won First Prize in chamber music at the age of 16, followed by First Prize in violin at the Conservatoire de Paris. She followed the masterclasses of Zakhar Bron, Yehudi Menuhin, Giorgio Ferrari. At 18, she won the First Prize in the Yehudi Menuhin International Competition in front of a jury composed of Lord Menuhin, Gidon Kremer, Vladimir Spivakov, Zakhar Bron, Bruno Monsaingeon and Maurizio Fuks.

She is known for her interpretations of the post-romantic repertoire, in particular for her interpretation of Sibelius' Violin Concerto Op. 47.

Selected discography 
1996: Sibelius by Marie Scheublé: violin concerto Op. 47, orchestral legend no. 1 Op. 22, Piece for violin and orchestra Op. 77 (Arion);
1995: Shostakovitch: concertos for violin n°1 and 2 (Arion).

References

External links 
 Marie Scheublé (L'Express)

21st-century French women classical violinists
1974 births
Living people
Conservatoire de Paris alumni